Sormida maculicollis is a species of beetle in the family Cerambycidae. It was described by Thomson in 1865.

References

Lamiinae
Beetles described in 1865